Vernon Smith (born May 30, 1964) is a Canadian retired professional ice hockey defenceman who played in one National Hockey League game for the New York Islanders during the 1984–85 NHL season.

Career statistics

See also
List of players who played only one game in the NHL

External links

1964 births
Albany Choppers players
Binghamton Whalers players
Canadian ice hockey defencemen
Capital District Islanders players
Erie Panthers players
Sportspeople from Lethbridge
Lethbridge Broncos players
Living people
Nanaimo Islanders players
New Haven Nighthawks players
New Westminster Bruins players
New York Islanders draft picks
New York Islanders players
Phoenix Roadrunners (IHL) players
Springfield Indians players
Ice hockey people from Alberta